Apoatropine (Atropatropine , ester of atropic acid) is a member of class of tropane alkaloids. Apoatropine can be found in plants of family Solanaceae. It is a bitter crystalline alkaloid. Examples of related tropane alkaloids include atropine, hyoscyamine, and hyoscine. Though apoatropine is found in various plants, it can also be prepared by the dehydration of atropine using nitric acid . Apoatropine is used as a pigment.

Toxicity
It is said to be 20 times more toxic than atropine.

References

Tropane alkaloids
Tropane alkaloids found in Solanaceae